The 11th Senate district of Wisconsin is one of 33 districts in the Wisconsin State Senate.  Located in southern Wisconsin, the district comprises most of Walworth County, the eastern half of Rock County, the southern half of Jefferson County, and part of western Kenosha County.

Current elected officials
Stephen Nass is the senator representing the 11th district. He was first elected in the 2014 general election, and is now serving in his second term.  Before his election as senator, he was a member of the State Assembly from 1991 to 2015.

Each Wisconsin State Senate district is composed of three State Assembly districts.  The 11th Senate district comprises the 31st, 32nd, and 33rd Assembly districts.  The current representatives of those districts are: 
 Assembly District 31: Ellen Schutt (R–Clinton)
 Assembly District 32: Tyler August (R–Lake Geneva)
 Assembly District 33: Scott Johnson (R–Hebron)

The 11th Senate district, in its current borders, crosses three different congressional districts.  The Jefferson County portions of the district fall within Wisconsin's 5th congressional district, which is represented by U.S. Representative Scott L. Fitzgerald; the areas of Rock County around Beloit fall within Wisconsin's 2nd congressional district, represented by U.S. Representative Mark Pocan; the remainder of the district falls within Wisconsin's 1st congressional district, represented by Bryan Steil.

Past senators
Note: the boundaries of districts have changed repeatedly over history. Previous politicians of a specific numbered district have represented a completely different geographic area, due to redistricting.

Previous senators from the district include:

Notes

References

External links
11th Senate District, Senator Kedzie in the Wisconsin Blue Book (2005–2006)
Senator Kedzie official campaign site

Wisconsin State Senate districts
Kenosha County, Wisconsin
Jefferson County, Wisconsin
Rock County, Wisconsin
Waukesha County, Wisconsin
Walworth County, Wisconsin
1848 establishments in Wisconsin